Gudeodiscus francoisi is a species of air-breathing land snail, a terrestrial pulmonate gastropod mollusk in the family Plectopylidae.

This species was described by French zoologist Pierre Marie Henri Fischer (1865-1916) (son of Paul-Henri Fischer) in 1898.

Distribution
The distribution of Gudeodiscus francoisi includes Vietnam.

Ecology
It is a ground-dwelling species as all other plectopylid snails in Vietnam.

It co-occur with other plectopylids in Vietnam: with Gudeodiscus anceyi, Gudeodiscus giardi. Gudeodiscus phlyarius and Gudeodiscus suprafilaris live at geographically close sites to Gudeodiscus francoisi.

References

External links

Plectopylidae
Gastropods described in 1898